Puthiya Thalaimurai is a Tamil magazine published from Chennai, India by New Generation Media . The Group also has an English website, www.thefederal.com. The Federal is a digital platform disseminating news, analysis and commentary. It seeks to look at India from the perspective of the states.

History and profile
Puthiya Thalaimurai was first published in October 2018. The magazine is published on a weekly basis. It mostly publishes articles about education and Tamil Nadu politics. The magazine features articles covering authentic news with no indication of rumours.

The Magazine awards the best performers in the teaching profession in Tamil Nadu with annual Asiriyar Awards since 2015. The awards are given to teachers who have shown excellence in the categories such as scientific awareness, rural service, girls' education, tribal development, innovation, motivation, language skill development and creativity.

Controversies

Bomb attack on Puthiya Thalaimurai Office 
On March 8 2015, Several protesters attacked a video journalist and broke his equipment outside the Puthiya Thalaimurai office. The protests reportedly started after promos of a show about Mangalsutra was aired on March 11, 2015. The protesters claimed it hurt their religious sentiments. 10 members of the Hindu Munnani outfit were arrested in connection with the incident. Tamilisai Soundararajan the then BJP state President visited the protesters in jail and pledged them her support.

On March 12, 2015, at about 3:00 a.m., four men came in motorcycles and threw two crude bombs stuffed in tiffin boxes into the Puthiya Thalaimurai office. The event was captured on CCTV cameras. No one was said to be injured in the attack. Later the ex-youth president of the Right-wing outfit Hindu Makkal Katchi and the current president of Hindu Ilaignar Sena, Mr. Pandian surrendered at the court of Madurai. Pandian has been named in a few cases together with an attack of a sub-inspector in Madurai.

References

External links
 Puthiya Thalaimurai Magazine website

Monthly magazines published in India
Political magazines published in India
Local interest magazines
Magazines established in 2009
Mass media in Chennai
Tamil-language magazines
2009 establishments in Tamil Nadu